Eximipriapulus is a genus of priapulid-like organisms, perhaps belonging to the crown group, known from the Chengjiang biota.

Paleoecology 
Eximipriapulus is known to live inside Hyolith shells. It is also an active burrower and is carnivorous.

References 

Priapulida
Prehistoric protostome genera
Cambrian China
Fossils of China
Fossil taxa described in 2014